Bruno Cerella (born July 30, 1986) is an Italian-Argentine professional basketball player for Blu Basket 1971 of the Italian Serie A2.

Hailing from Bahía Blanca, a city seeped in basketball tradition, where players such as Manu Ginóbili were born and raised. Having come to Italy as a teenager, he slowly established himself, and moved up the league levels to join Emporio Armani Milano, where he became a fan favourite, due to his dynamism and dedication to the team. In August 2017, Cerella was sent on loan to Reyer Venezia of the LBA.

Professional career
After playing junior youth basketball for Estudiantes de Bahía Blanca and Pueyrredon in his birth country of Argentina, Cerella moved to Italy at age 17, to play professional basketball. After playing for a succession of teams in the Italian lower level divisions, he joined Banca Tercas Teramo in the Italian first division in 2008.

Along with David Moss, he helped the team reach the semifinals of the 2009 Italian Cup, and to a third place finish in the Italian League's regular season, before being eliminated in the playoffs by Emporio Armani Milano. After a few LBA seasons, he joined Emporio Armani Milano in 2013, and with them he participated in Europe's premier basketball competition, the EuroLeague, for the first time in his career.

In August 2017, Cerella was sent on loan to Umana Reyer Venezia, the defending Italian champions. While playing for Reyer Venezia in the 2017–18 season, Cerella won the FIBA Europe Cup. He re-signed with Reyer Venezia on June 13, 2020.

National team career
Cerella was a member of the senior men's Italian national basketball team in 2008, although he never played in an official competition.

Player profile
Although rarely a starter, and not a prolific scorer, Cerrella is known on his teams as a luxury bench option, who will reliably perform his defensive duties, contribute with steals, and rarely turnover the ball on offense.

Personal life
Of Italian heritage, though his paternal grandfather, he became an Italian citizen when he was 15.

He created with fellow player Tommaso Marino, and others, the charity project “Slums Dunk”, that he operates during the off-season in Kenya and Zambia. It aims to provide basketball coaching, facilities, and education to underprivileged youngsters in slums.

In his free time, he enjoys scuba diving and tourism.

One of his good friends is fellow Bahía Blanca native Rodrigo Palacio, who also lives in Milan, and is a basketball fan.

References

External links
 Bruno Cerella at eurobasket.com
 Bruno Cerella at euroleague.net
 Bruno Cerella at legabasket.it

1986 births
Living people
Argentine men's basketball players
Argentine expatriate sportspeople in Italy
Argentine people of Italian descent
Italian men's basketball players
Lega Basket Serie A players
Olimpia Milano players
Pallacanestro Varese players
People with acquired Italian citizenship
Reyer Venezia players
Shooting guards
Small forwards
Sportspeople from Bahía Blanca
Teramo Basket players